The Voluntary Medical Service Medal is a medal awarded by St Andrew's First Aid and formerly by the British Red Cross. It was instituted in 1932 at the direction of George V.

Criteria
To qualify for the medal, a member must accrue fifteen years' continuous efficient service as a first aid volunteer in either the Red Cross or St Andrew's providing a minimum of ten hours field service per year. Service for the medal was retrospective to the creation of Voluntary Aid Detachments in 1909.

Appearance
The obverse bears a symbolic representation of Florence Nightingale carrying a lamp. The reverse features a design of both the Geneva and St Andrew's crosses to denote the two qualifying organisations. Between the upper arms of the St Andrew's Cross is the text LONG AND EFFICIENT SERVICE. The medal was originally made of silver, later of silver plated copper, and since the 1960s of copper-nickel. It is suspended from a straight swivel bar and hangs from a ribbon of red with yellow stripes at the edges and a thin white stripe in the centre.

On the suspension ribbon of the medal, clasps embellished with the Geneva cross for Red Cross service or the St Andrew's cross for St Andrews First Aid service are worn to denote five additional years of qualifying service. In undress uniform, on the ribbon of the medal, one silver Geneva or St Andrew's cross emblem is added to the medal ribbon for five additional years of service.  At twenty years of additional service the silver emblems are replaced by a silver-gilt emblem. Up to four silver-gilt emblems can replace the silver type to denote 25, 30, and 35 years of service in the applicable voluntary organisation.

References

Voluntary Medical Service Medal
Military medicine in the United Kingdom
Medals of the International Red Cross and Red Crescent Movement
Awards established in 1932
1932 establishments in the United Kingdom
Long and Meritorious Service Medals of Britain and the Commonwealth